Nowe Brynki  (German Neu Brünken) is a village in the administrative district of Gmina Gryfino, within Gryfino County, West Pomeranian Voivodeship, in north-western Poland, close to the German border.

For the history of the region, see History of Pomerania.

The village has a population of 90.

References

Nowe Brynki